John Paul Frank (November 10, 1917 – September 7, 2002) was an American lawyer and scholar involved in landmark civil rights, school desegregation, and criminal procedure cases before the United States Supreme Court.

Biography

Frank attended the University of Wisconsin and obtained a B.A. and M.A. in history. In 1940, Frank graduated with an LL.B. from the University of Wisconsin Law School with Order of the Coif honors. He clerked for Justice Hugo Black of the U.S. Supreme Court from 1942 to 1943. Frank spent the next two years as the assistant to the Secretary of the Interior and then to the U.S. Attorney General. He studied at Yale Law School and obtained a S.J.D. in 1947. In 1946, he joined the faculty of the Indiana University, Bloomington School of Law. He returned to Yale Law School to teach from 1949 to 1954, when he joined the law firm of Lewis & Roca in Phoenix, Arizona.

Notable legal activity
Frank helped then-Chief Counsel for the NAACP Legal Defense and Educational Fund, Thurgood Marshall, formulate strategy in the school desegregation case of Brown v. Board of Education of Topeka (1954). Frank argued the case of Miranda v. Arizona (1966), which required that police inform criminal suspects of their rights. In Bates v. State Bar of Arizona (1977), Frank unsuccessfully argued before the U.S. Supreme Court that state bar limits on attorney advertising were consistent with the right to free speech under the First Amendment.

Frank's papers are held at the Library of Congress.

Personal life
In 1940, he married Lorraine Weiss (June 7, 1923 – December 22, 2005), a graduate of Vassar College, and they had five children.

Selected publications

See also 
List of law clerks of the Supreme Court of the United States (Seat 1)

References

1917 births
2002 deaths
University of Wisconsin–Madison alumni
University of Wisconsin–Madison College of Letters and Science alumni
Yale Law School alumni
Yale Law School faculty
Indiana University faculty
Law clerks of the Supreme Court of the United States
20th-century American lawyers
American legal scholars
Legal writers
American political writers
American scholars of constitutional law
People from Appleton, Wisconsin
Lawyers from Phoenix, Arizona